Myrceugenia rufescens is a species of plant in the family Myrtaceae. It is endemic to Brazil.

References

rufescens
Endemic flora of Brazil
Vulnerable flora of South America
Taxa named by Augustin Pyramus de Candolle
Taxonomy articles created by Polbot